Joe Panos (born Zois Panagiotopoulos on January 24, 1971) is a former American football offensive lineman in the National Football League for the Philadelphia Eagles and Buffalo Bills. After Brookfield East High School, he played college football at the University of Wisconsin–Madison, where he was a walk on and later became captain of the 1994 Rose Bowl team.

Career

College
Panos started his college career playing defensive tackle at Division III University of Wisconsin-Whitewater. He transferred to the University of Wisconsin-Madison and quickly became a starter. He played in 32 consecutive games.

Awards
1992 Second-team All-Big Ten 
1993 1st team All-Big Ten 
1993 2nd Team All-American. 
1994 co-captain of the Rose Bowl championship team.

Pro football
Panos was drafted by the Eagles with the 77th pick in the third round of the 1994 NFL Draft. He played in the NFL for 6 years. During his time with the Philadelphia Eagles and the Buffalo Bills he played in 83 games and he started 56 games. He had 17 penalties over his NFL career. He is now a sports agent with Athletes First, Panos represents Green Bay Packers quarterback Aaron Rodgers and linebacker Clay Matthews, among other NFL players.

Personal life
Panos was married to Michelle; together they have 3 kids. George is a scout for Houston, and Alex plays football at St. Thomas University in Minnesota. Their youngest child, Olivia is in college at the University of Wisconsin Madison.

References

1971 births
Living people
American football offensive guards
American football centers
Philadelphia Eagles players
Buffalo Bills players
Wisconsin Badgers football players
Wisconsin–Whitewater Warhawks football players
People from Brookfield, Wisconsin
Players of American football from Wisconsin
American sports agents
Ed Block Courage Award recipients